Balzer Jacobsen was Lawman (prime minister) of the Faroe Islands from 1655 to 1661.

Balzer Jacobsen was Danish, and was put in place by King Frederik III against the will of the Faroese Løgting. Jacobsen was first and foremost of Christoffer Gabel's men, who was vogt (overseer) of the Faroe Islands. Gabel also had a monopoly on trade to and from the islands during this period. In 1661, Jógvan Poulsen regained control as Lawman and Jacobsen withdrew to Denmark, but the real power in the Faroe Islands still lay with the land owners. This period of Faroese history is known in Faroese as Gablatíðin, and was difficult due to the trade monopoly and wishes from Copenhagen about the crown's absolute control of the fiefdom.

References

Løgtingið 150 - Hátíðarrit. Tórshavn 2002, Bind 2, S. 366. (Avsnitt Føroya løgmenn fram til 1816) (PDF-Download)

Year of birth missing
Year of death missing
Faroese people of Danish descent
Lawmen of the Faroe Islands
17th-century Danish people